The Pines was a house in Anniston, Alabama.  It was designed by architect Walter T. Downing and built in 1896.  It was listed on the National Register of Historic Places in 1991.  The listing included one contributing building and one contributing structure. The house was demolished in April 2014.

References

National Register of Historic Places in Calhoun County, Alabama
Colonial Revival architecture in Alabama
Houses completed in 1896
Houses in Calhoun County, Alabama
Buildings and structures in Anniston, Alabama
Houses on the National Register of Historic Places in Alabama
Demolished buildings and structures in Alabama
Buildings and structures demolished in 2014